The Mexico women's national volleyball team participates in international volleyball competitions.

Results

World Championship
 1970 — 12th place 
 1974 — 10th place 
 1978 — 15th place 
 1982 — 13th place 
 1998 — did not qualify
 1990 — did not qualify
 1994 — did not qualify
 1998 — did not qualify
 2002 — 21st place
 2006 — 21st place
 2010 — did not qualify
 2014 — 21st place
 2018 — 16th place
 2022 — did not qualify

Pan American Games
 1955 —  Gold Medal
 1959 — did not participate
 1963 — 3rd place
 1967 — 5th place
 1971 — 3rd place
 1975 — 3rd place
 1979 — 5th place
 1983 — did not participate
 1987 — did not participate
 1991 — did not participate
 1995 — did not participate
 1999 — did not participate
 2003 — 8th place
 2007 — 7th place
 2011 — 8th place
 2015 — did not participate
 2019 — did not participate

Pan-American Cup
2002 — 4th place
2003 — 8th place
2004 — 7th place
2005 — 7th place
2006 — 9th place
2007 — 10th place
2008 — 10th place
2009 — 9th place
2010 — 9th place
2011 — 9th place
2012 — 12th place
2013 — 12th place
2014 — 8th place
2015 — 10th place
2016 — 11th place
2017 — 11th place
2018 — 10th place
2019 — 9th place
2021 —  Silver medal
2022 — 4th place

NORCECA Championship
1987 — 4th place
1989 — 4th place
1991 — 4th place
1993 — 4th place
1995 — 6th place
1997 — 6th place
1999 — 6th place
2001 — 4th place
2003 — did not compete
2005 — 7th place
2007 — 6th place
2009 — 6th place
2011 — 5th place
2013 — 5th place
2015 — 6th place
2019 — 5th place
2021 — 5th place

Final Four Cup
2008 — did not participate
2009 — did not participate
2010 — 4th place

Current squad
The following is the Mexican roster in the 2018 World Championship.

Head coach:  Ricardo Naranjo

See also
Mexico women's national under-20 volleyball team
Mexico women's national under-18 volleyball team

References

External links
Official website
FIVB profile

National women's volleyball teams
Volleyball in Mexico
Volleyball